West Buffalo may refer to:

West Buffalo, Ohio, a ghost town
West Buffalo Township, Union County, Pennsylvania, a civil township